Dinckley is a small village and civil parish located in the Ribble Valley, in Lancashire, England. Owing to the limited extent of the population details from the Census 2011 are maintained within the civil parish of Billington and Langho. The northern boundary of the parish is formed by the River Ribble, and the eastern boundary by Park Brook and Dinckley Brook. The parish is part of the Langho ward, which is represented on Ribble Valley Borough Council by two councillors, both from the Conservative Party.

Dinckley Ferry was a rowing boat which crossed the river connecting the village to Hurst Green. The ferry was replaced by a suspension bridge in the 1950s.

Listed building

There is one listed building in the parish; this is Dinckley Hall which is listed at Grade II*.  The house basically has a cruck frame, its exterior was originally timber-framed, and it was subsequently encased in sandstone and brick.  It consists of a hall and a cross wing, there are two storeys, and it contains mullioned and transomed windows.

References

External links

Villages in Lancashire
Civil parishes in Lancashire
Geography of Ribble Valley